Manokwari Regency is a regency in West Papua, Indonesia. Following the splitting away of twenty of its former districts in 2013, it now covers an area of 3,168.28 km2 and had a population of 192,663 at the 2020 Census. The administrative centre (regency seat) is presently at the town of Manokwari, which is also the capital of the province, but under proposals currently under consideration by the Indonesian Parliament, the town is intended to be split off from the regency to form a separate independent city.

Administration
At the 2010 Census, Manokwari Regency comprised 29 districts (Kecamatan) with an area of 34,970 km2 and a 2010 Census population of 187,726, but in 2013 two new regencies  - South Manokwari Regency (Manokwari Selantan) with six districts, and Arfak Mountains Regency (Pegunungan Arfak) with ten districts - were created from parts of the Manokwari Regency, while the most westerly four districts (Kebar, Amberbaken, Mubrani and Senopi, which were the largest in area of the remaining districts, although sparsely populated) were removed from Manokwari Regency and added to the Tambrauw Regency.

The residual area of Manokwari Regency thus comprised nine districts, listed below with their areas and their populations at the 2010 Census and the 2020 Census. The table also includes the location of the district centres, the number of administrative villages (rural desa and urban kelurahan) in each district, and its postal code.

Notes: (a) except for the village of Mebji, with a post code of 98315. (b) except for the villages of Manokwari Timur (with a post code of 98311) and Amban (with a post code of 98314). (c) includes the offshore islands of Pulau Lemon and Pulau Mansinam. (d) except for the two villages of Arowi and Pasir Putih (with a post code of 98313). (e) includes the offshore islands of Pulau Irbor, Pulau Irbor Utara, Pulau Kaki and Pulau Waisupi. (g) includes the offshore island of Pulau Raimuti.

References

External links
Statistics publications from Statistics Indonesia (BPS)

 
Manokwari
Regencies of West Papua (province)